Amara Lallwala Palliyagurunnans also known as Amara Indumathi (born 1986) is a Sri Lankan female Paralympic athlete. She competed at the 2012 Summer Paralympics and at the 2016 Summer Paralympics. Indumathi became the first Sri Lankan woman athlete to represent Sri Lanka at the Paralympics.

Amara has represented her nation at two World Para Athletics Championships in 2013 World Para Athletics Championships and in 2017 World Para Athletics Championships.

Career 
 Athletics at the 2012 Summer Paralympics – Women's 100 metres - Round 1
 Athletics at the 2012 Summer Paralympics - Women's 200 metres - Round 1
 Athletics at the 2016 Summer Paralympics – Women's 200 metres - 6th 
 Athletics at the 2016 Summer Paralympics – Women's long jump - 12th 
 Athletics at the 2016 Summer Paralympics - Women's 400 metres - 5th

References 

1986 births
Living people
Sri Lankan female sprinters
Sri Lankan female long jumpers
Athletes (track and field) at the 2012 Summer Paralympics
Paralympic athletes of Sri Lanka
Athletes (track and field) at the 2016 Summer Paralympics